Metera or መጠራ (𐩣𐩷𐩧)
is a small town and important archeological site located in the Debub Region of Eritrea. Situated a few kilometers south of Senafe (ሰንዓፈ), it was a major city in the Dʿmt (𐩵𐩲𐩣𐩩) and Aksumite kingdoms. Since Eritrean independence, the National Museum of Eritrea has petitioned the Ethiopian government to return artifacts removed from the site. However, the efforts have thus far been rebuffed.

History

Matara is the name of both a small village and an important archaeological site in Eritrea. The latter is located some 136 kilometers southeast of the capital Asmara, just past Senafe on the road leading south to the border with the northern Tigray Region of Ethiopia. The archaeological site already has yielded evidence of several levels of habitation, including at least two different major cities, covering more than 1000 years. The topmost layers are associated with the Aksumite Empire and date from the fourth to the eighth centuries. This city was allied with or part of the powerful trading empire centered in the capital, Aksum, to the southwest. It appears that Matara was one of a string of cities along the trade route that ran from Aksum to its port city, Adulis, whose extensive ruins, surveyed but largely unexcavated, are in the vicinity of Zula, southeast of Massawa on the Red Sea coast.

Hawulti, a pre-Aksumite or early Aksumite era obelisk, is situated here.

See also
Adulis
Keskese
Nakfa
Qohaito
Sembel
Mendefera

References

External links
Matara

Aksumite cities
Archaeological sites in Eritrea
Southern Region (Eritrea)
Former populated places in Eritrea